Native grape may refer to certain plants within the family Vitaceae including:

Cissus hypoglauca
Cayratia clematidea

See also
Ampelocissus acetosa, wild grape
Grape